The following is a list of governors of the Central Bank of the Republic of Turkey.

From its foundation until January 26, 1970, the heads of the Central Bank were in the status of General Director. Thereafter the title was changed to Governor.

References
 Newspaper Tercüman 
 Newspaper Dünya 

Governors, Central Bank
Economy of Turkey-related lists

Turkey